Deryck Fox (born 17 September 1964) is an English former professional rugby league footballer who played in the 1980s and 1990s, and coached in the 1990s, 2000s and 2010s. He attended St John Fisher's RC High School in Dewsbury.

Club career

Early career
Fox began playing rugby league for St John Fisher Catholic High School in Dewsbury, and was selected for the 1983 BARLA Great Britain youth tour of New Zealand. He turned professional after returning from the tour, signing for Featherstone Rovers.

Featherstone Rovers
Fox made his debut as a substitute against Hull in an 8–24 defeat in the first round of the Yorkshire Cup on 4 September 1983.

He played , was captain, and scored 3-goals in Featherstone Rovers' 14–20 defeat by Bradford Northern in the 1989 Yorkshire Cup final during the 1989–90 season at Headingley, Leeds on Sunday 5 November 1989.

Bradford Northern
In 1992, Fox was signed by Bradford Northern for a fee of £140,000 - a record fee at the time for a scrum-half.

He played  in Bradford Northern's 8–15 defeat by Wigan in the 1992–93 Regal Trophy final during the 1992–93 season at Elland Road, Leeds on Saturday 23 January 1993.

Later career
Fox returned to Featherstone during the 1995–96 season, and went on to play for Batley Bulldogs and Rochdale Hornets.

In 2010, Fox was inducted into the Featherstone Rovers Hall of Fame.

Representative career

County honours
Fox won caps for Yorkshire while at Featherstone Rovers; during the 1985–86 season against Lancashire and New Zealand, during the 1986–87 season against Lancashire, during the 1987–88 season against Lancashire, and Papua New Guinea, during the 1988–89 season against Lancashire, during the 1989–90 season against Lancashire, and during the 1991–92 season against Lancashire.

International honours
Fox won caps for England while at Bradford Northern in 1995 against Wales and France, and won caps for Great Britain while at Featherstone Rovers in 1985 against France (2 matches), and New Zealand (3 matches), in 1986 against France (2 matches), and Australia (2 matches), in 1989 against New Zealand (sub), in 1990 against Papua New Guinea (sub), in 1991 against Papua New Guinea (sub), in 1992 against France (sub), and while at Bradford Northern in 1992 Australia.

He was selected to go on the 1990 and 1992 Great Britain Lions tour.

Personal life
Deryck Fox is the son of the rugby league  who played in the 1970s for Batley, John Fox, and the brother of the rugby league footballer who played in the 1980s for Featherstone Rovers, Martin Fox.

References

1964 births
Living people
Batley Bulldogs players
Bradford Bulls players
England national rugby league team players
English rugby league coaches
English rugby league players
Featherstone Rovers players
Great Britain national rugby league team players
Place of birth missing (living people)
Rochdale Hornets coaches
Rochdale Hornets players
Rugby league halfbacks
Rugby league players from Dewsbury
Western Suburbs Magpies players
Yorkshire rugby league team players